Rhynchium is an Australian, Afrotropical, Indomalayan and Palearctic genus of potter wasps.

Species
Species classified under Rhynchium include:

Rhynchium acromum Giordani Soika, 1952
Rhynchium annuliferum Boisduval, 1835
Rhynchium ardens Smith, 1873
Rhynchium atrissimum Vecht, 1968
Rhynchium atrum Saussure, 1852
Rhynchium australense Perkins, 1914
Rhynchium bandrense Dusmet, 1930
Rhynchium bathyxanthum Vecht, 1963
Rhynchium brunneum (Fabricius, 1793)
Rhynchium carnaticum (Fabricius, 1798)
Rhynchium claripenne Giordani Soika, 1994
Rhynchium collinum Cameron, 1903
Rhynchium cyanopterum Saussure, 1852
Rhynchium fervens Walker, 1871
Rhynchium fukaii Cameron, 1911
Rhynchium haemorrhoidale (Fabricius, 1775)
Rhynchium japonicum Dalla Torre, 1894
Rhynchium khandalense Dusmet, 1930
Rhynchium kuenckeli Maindron, 1882
Rhynchium lacuum Stadelmann, 1898
Rhynchium magnificum Smith, 1869
Rhynchium marginellum (Fabricius, 1793)
Rhynchium marianense (Bequaert & Yasumatsu, 1939)
Rhynchium medium Maindron, 1882
Rhynchium mirabile Saussure, 1852
Rhynchium multispinosum (Saussure, 1855)
Rhynchium neavei Meade-Waldo, 1911
Rhynchium nigrolimbatum Bingham, 1912
Rhynchium nigrosericeum Giordani Soika, 1990
Rhynchium oculatum (Fabricius, 1781)
Rhynchium patrizii Guiglia, 1931
Rhynchium proserpina Schulthess, 1923
Rhynchium quinquecinctum (Fabricius, 1787)
Rhynchium rubropictum Smith, 1861
Rhynchium rufiventre Radoszkowski, 1881
Rhynchium superbum Saussure, 1852
Rhynchium thomsoni Cameron, 1910
Rhynchium transvaalensis Cameron, 1910
Rhynchium usambaraense Cameron, 1910
Rhynchium varipes Perkins, 1905
Rhynchium versicolor (Kirby, 1900)
Rhynchium vittatum Buysson, 1909
Rhynchium xanthurum Saussure, 1856
Rhynchium zonatum Walker, 1871

References

Biological pest control wasps
Potter wasps